Sardar Patel Halt railway station is a small railway station in Nalanda district, Bihar. Its code is SDPH. It serves Rajgir town. The station consists of one platform. The platform is not well sheltered. It lacks many facilities including water and sanitation.

Trains 
 Daniyawan–Fatuha Passenger (unreserved)

Transport links
 62 km from Gaya Airport

References

Railway stations in Nalanda district
Danapur railway division